Alzir Hella (30 December 1881 – 14 July 1953) was a French translator.

1881 births
1953 deaths
German–French translators
Recipients of the Legion of Honour
French male non-fiction writers
20th-century French translators
20th-century French male writers